Killikaike is an extinct genus of New World monkey. The genus includes one species, Killikaike blakei, that lived in Argentina during the Early Miocene.

Killikaike blakei was collected in southern-most Argentina in January, 2005 and the type specimen consists of a remarkably well preserved face.  Unfortunately the neurocranium is not present. The specimen was named for the locality where it was found Killik Aike Norte, on the estate of the Blake family.

Perry et al. (2014) considered K. blakei to be a junior synonym of Homunculus patagonicus. However, Silvestro at al. (2017) considered Killikaike to be a distinct genus. Kay & Perry (2019) continued to regard the species as synonymous.

References 

†Killikaike
Prehistoric monkeys
Prehistoric primate genera
Monotypic mammal genera
Miocene primates of South America
Neogene Argentina
Fossils of Argentina
Fossil taxa described in 2006